The Ministry of Civil Aviation (MGA SSSR for ) was a government ministry in the Soviet Union.

Formed in August 1964 from the Main Administration for the Civil Airfleet in the Ministry of Defense, MGA provided commercial passenger and cargo service under the Aeroflot brand as well as agricultural and other aerial works.

MGA SSSR ministers
Source:
 Yevgeni Loginov (28.7.1964 - 20.5.1970)
 Boris Bugayev (20.5.1970 - 4.5.1987)
  (4.5.1987 - 29.3.1990)
 Boris Panjukov (18.4.1990 - 28.8.1991)

See also
Glossary of Russian and USSR aviation acronyms

References

Civil Aviation
Aviation in the Soviet Union